The 15th arrondissement of Paris (XVe arrondissement) is one of the 20 arrondissements of the capital city of France. In spoken French, this arrondissement is referred to as quinzième.

The arrondissement, called Vaugirard, is situated on the left bank of the River Seine. Sharing the Montparnasse district with the 6th and 14th arrondissements, it is the city's most populous arrondissement. The Tour Montparnasse – the tallest skyscraper in Paris – and the neighbouring Gare Montparnasse are both located in the 15th arrondissement, at its border with the 14th.  It is also home to the convention center Paris expo Porte de Versailles and the high-rise district of the Front de Seine (or Beaugrenelle). In 2026, the 180 meters high Tour Triangle will house a 120-room hotel and 70,000 square metres of office space.

History
The loi du 16 juin 1859 decreed the annexation to Paris of the area between the old Wall of the Ferme générale and the wall of Thiers. The communes of Grenelle, Vaugirard, and Javel were incorporated into Paris in 1860.

Charles Michels (b. 1903), was elected Député for the 15th arrondissement by the Popular Front; He was taken hostage and shot by the Nazis in 1941.

Quarters
As in all the Parisian arrondissements, the fifteenth is made up of four administrative quarters (quartiers).

 To the south, quartier Saint-Lambert occupies the former site of the village of Vaugirard, built along an ancient Roman road. The geography of the area was particularly suited to wine-making, as well as quarrying. In fact, many Parisian monuments, such as the École Militaire, were built from Vaugirard stone. The village, not yet being part of Paris, was considered by Parisians to be an agreeable suburb, pleasant for country walks or its cabarets and puppet shows. In 1860 Vaugirard was annexed to Paris, along with adjoining villages. Today, notable attractions in this area include the Parc des Expositions (an exhibition center which hosts the Foire de Paris, agricultural expositions, and car shows), and Parc Georges-Brassens, a park built on the former site of a slaughterhouse where every year wine by the name of Clos des Morillons is produced and auctioned at the civic center.
 To the east, quartier Necker was originally an uninhabited space between Paris and Vaugirard. The most well-known landmarks in the area are the Gare Montparnasse train station and the looming Tour Montparnasse office tower. The area around the train station has been renovated and now contains a number of office and apartment blocks, a park (the Jardin Atlantique, built directly over the train tracks), and a shopping center. Finally, the quartier contains a number of public buildings: the Lycée Buffon, the Necker Children's Hospital, as well as the private foundation Pasteur Institute.
 To the north, quartier Grenelle was originally a village of the same name. Grenelle plain extended from the current Hôtel des Invalides to the suburb of Issy-les-Moulineaux on the other side of the Seine, but remained mostly uninhabited in centuries past due to difficulties farming the land. At the beginning of the 19th century, an entrepreneur by the name of Violet divided off a section of the plain: this became the village of Beaugrenelle, known for its series of straight streets and blocks, which remain today. The whole area broke off from the commune of Vaugirard in 1830, becoming the commune of Grenelle, which was in turn annexed to Paris in 1860. A century later, a number of apartment and office towers were built along the Seine, the Front de Seine along with the Beaugrenelle shopping mall.
 To the west, quartier Javel lies to the south of Grenelle plain. In years past, it was the industrial area of the arrondissement: first with chemical companies (the famous Eau de Javel [bleach] was invented and produced there), then electrical companies (Thomson), and finally car manufacturers (Citroën), whose factories occupied a large part of the quartier up until the early 1970s. The industrial areas have since been rehabilitated, and the neighbourhood now contains Parc André Citroën, Georges Pompidou European Hospital, and a number of large office buildings and television studios (Sagem, Snecma, the Direction Générale de l'Aviation Civile, Canal Plus, France Télévisions, etc.). In addition, to the south of the circular highway (boulevard périphérique), an extension of the 15th, formerly an aerodrome at the beginning of the 20th century, is now a heliport, a gym and a recreation center.

The early airfield here has been encroached upon by urban development and a sports centre, but the residual area, mainly laid to grass, continues to serve Paris as a heliport. The Sécurité Civile has a detachment there close to maintenance facilities. Customs facilities are available and especially busy during the Salon d'Aeronautique airshows held at Le Bourget on the other side of the city.

Geography

The 15th arrondissement is located in the south-western part of Paris, on the left bank of the Seine. It includes one of the three islands in Paris, the Île aux Cygnes. 

At 8.5 km2 (3.28 sq. miles, or 2,100 acres), it is the third largest arrondissement in Paris, and would be the largest if the large parks Bois de Boulogne and Bois de Vincennes were not counted as part of the 16th and 12th arrondissements.

Demography
The peak of population of Paris's 15th arrondissement occurred in 1962, when it had 250,551 inhabitants. Since then it has lost approximately one-tenth of its population, but it remains the most populous arrondissement of Paris, with 225,362 inhabitants at the last census in 1999. With 144,667 jobs at the same census, the 15th is also very dense in business activities. This arrondissement is home to many families and is known in Paris as one of the quietest sections in Paris. The majority of the arrondissement is relatively unfrequented by tourists, a rarity for one of the world's most visited cities.

Historical population

Immigration

Places of interest

 Grand Pavois de Paris (1971), one of the largest real estate complexes in Paris
 Musée Pasteur
 Musée du Service des Objets Trouvés
 Musée Bourdelle
 Musée Mendjisky, specializing in school of Paris artists, housed in a Robert Mallet-Stevens building.
  Musée Jean Moulin, French Resistance – (musées Leclerc-Moulin)
 Church of Notre-Dame de la Salette in Paris
 Beaugrenelle Shopping Center
 Parts of the Montparnasse area.
 The former workshop (no longer standing) of Constantin Brâncuși, where the sculptor worked from 1925 to 1957 has now been relocated in front of the Centre Georges Pompidou
 Villa Santos Dumont where Ossip Zadkine and Fernand Léger had their workshop, also featured in Gail Albert Halaban book Out of my Window, Paris.
 La Ruche
 Square Béla Bartók where the sculpture-fountain Cristaux by Jean-Yves Lechevallier can be seen.
 Square de l'Oiseau-Lunaire, featuring a sculpture by Juan Miro (the L'Oiseau Lunaire) with a plaque commemorating the many artists, poets and painters or sculptors who lived there, including André Masson, Jean Dubuffet, Antonin Artaud and Robert Desnos.
 A replica of the statue of Liberty on the île aux Cygnes where Bartholdi worked.
 The Pont de Bir-Hakeim
 The Pont Mirabeau
 The Parc André Citroën with the Ballon de Paris.
 The Parc Georges-Brassens
 The Polypores Fountain by Jean-Yves Lechevallier featured in the movie by Alain Resnais Same Old Song.
 Paris expo Porte de Versailles exhibition center (with the Tour Triangle project) and Palais des Sports, near Porte de Versailles metro station.
 Front de Seine high-rise district.
 Cheminée du Front de Seine is a  chimney that is the 4th tallest structure in Paris

Government and infrastructure
 At one time the head office of the Bureau Enquêtes-Accidents was in the 15th arrondissement.
 Since November 2015 the French Ministère des Armées ("Ministry of the Armed Forces") has been located in purpose-built building near the Balard Métro station.
 Australian Embassy
 Japanese Cultural Center in Paris
 Institut Français

Economy

 The headquarters of Orange S.A. and Eutelsat are located in the 15th arrondissement.
 La Poste, the French mail service, has its head office in the arrondissement.
 The publisher Hachette Livre also has its headquarters in the arrondissement.
 Prior to the completion of the current Air France headquarters in Tremblay-en-France in December 1995, Air France was headquartered in a tower located next to the Gare Montparnasse rail station in Montparnasse and in the 15th arrondissement; Air France had its headquarters in the tower for about 30 years.
 Previously the Tour Maine-Montparnasse, in the 15th arrondissement of Paris housed the executive management of Accor.
 Journal officiel de la République française
 French Football Federation
 Conseil supérieur de l'audiovisuel
 Safran
 Institut français des relations internationales
 European Space Agency
 International Energy Agency
 Eutelsat
 France Télévisions
 International Council of Museums
 Hôpital Européen Georges-Pompidou

Education and research

Schiller International University has a campus in the arrondissement. It is in proximity to Place de la Convention.
 The arrondissement is also host to the École Active Bilingue Jeannine Manuel international school and the international bilingual school, Victor Hugo, (école internationale bilingue)
International Culinary school Le Cordon Bleu, established in 1895, has a campus in the 15th (rue Léon Delhomme)
 Necker-Enfants Malades Hospital affiliated to the University of Paris Descartes, (pediatrics)
Pantheon-Sorbonne University, Saint Charles Campus - Visual arts and aesthetics.
Panthéon-Assas University, Campus Vaugirard, Law school
PariSanté Campus
Pasteur Institute
Laboratoire de Phonétique et Phonologie

Notable people

 Brigitte Bardot, actress
 Samuel Beckett, writer, who lived in the 15th arrondissement for most of his adult life
 Walter Benjamin, philosopher
 Luc Besson, filmmaker
 Antoine Bourdelle, artist
 Alexander Calder, artist
 Marc Chagall, artist
 Barbara Chase-Riboud, artist
 Dietrich von Choltitz, military governor of Paris, 1944–1945
 André Citroën, industrialist
 Robert Desnos, poet and member of the French Resistance
 Michel Foucault, philosopher
 Tsuguharu Foujita, artist
 François Hollande, President of France (2012–2017)
 René Magritte, artist
 Sophie Marceau, actress
 André Masson, artist
 Henry Miller, writer, lived in the 15th where he worked on Tropic of Cancer.
 Joan Miró, artist
 Jacques Monod and Francois Jacob discovered the mechanism of genes' transcription regulation, a work honored by the 1965 Nobel Prize in Physiology or Medicine.
 Luc Montagnier, Françoise Barré-Sinoussi and colleagues discovered the two HIV viruses that cause AIDS, in 1983 and 1985, were honored by the 2008 Nobel Prize in Physiology or Medicine.
 Louis Pasteur, microbiologist
 Marie-Claire Pauwels, journalist
 Ossip Zadkine, artist
 Nekfeu, hip-hop artist

See also
 Front de Seine

References

Bibliography

External links